The men's road race at the 1952 UCI Road World Championships was the 19th edition of the event. The race took place on Sunday 24 August 1952 in Luxembourg. The race was won by Heinz Müller of West Germany.

Final classification

References

Men's Road Race
UCI Road World Championships – Men's road race